Pure Imagination is a comic book, magazine, and comics-related book publisher run by Greg Theakston since 1975.

While briefly doing some original comics in the 1990s, as well a publishing a few "girlie" magazines, Pure Imagination's main focus has been publishing books to preserve the great works of several comic artists.  This includes the aborted Complete Jack Kirby series, and the several Reader volumes that continue to this day.  Another series is Edge of Genius, which focuses on the period in which artists "come into their own." Pure Imagination has also produced some CDs that reprint multiple editions of the Reader books.

Titles

Comics
 Buried Treasure, three issues
 Doc Weird's Thrill Book, three issues, 1987–88
 Intense!, three issues, 1993
 Lone Ranger, one issue
 Pure Images, five issues
 Sky Masters, one issue, 1991
 Torchy, five issues and one Annual

Magazines
 Betty Pages, nine issues and two Annuals (1987–93)
 Buried Treasure, three issues (1986–87)
 Tease, nine issues, (1995-2003)
 The Neal Adams Treasury V1&2
 Lou Fine Comics Treasury, 1991
 The Frank Frazetta Treasury
 The Jack Kirby Treasury, V1&2 (1982)
 The Wallace Wood Treasury
 The Berni Wrightson Treasury
 Johnny Comet
 The Rare Frazetta
 White Indian
 The Comic Strip Frazetta
 Simon & Kirby Classics 1- Stuntman, 1987

Books
 Forrest Ackerman's Wonderama Annual, 1993 
 Vaughn Bode: Rare and Well Done, 2006
 The Best of Jack Cole, 2006 (Quality work from 1938 to 1953) 
 Steve Ditko: Edge of Genius, 2009
 Steve Ditko Reader, 2002 (Charlton work from 1954 to 1960, 63) 
 Steve Ditko Reader v2, 2004 (Charlton work from 1957 to 1959, 62)  
 Steve Ditko Reader v3, 2005 (Charlton work from 1954 to 1959, 66) 
 Steve Ditko's The Thing, 2005 (all Ditko's work from The Thing!, plus Charlton 1957–60) 
 Big Book o' Ditko, 2010 
 Will Eisner: Edge of Genius 2007 
 The Eisner Shop
 Lou Fine Reader, 2003 (Flame, Doll Man, Uncle Sam, Ray, Black Condor work) 
 Lou Fine Reader v2
 The Comic Strip Jack Kirby, 2006 (Syndicated work 1936–39) 
 Complete Sky Masters of the Space Force, 2000 
 Complete Jack Kirby
 Volume 1: 1917–40, 1997 
 Volume 2: September 1940 to March 1941, 1997 
 Volume 3: March - May 1947, 1998  
 Volume 4: June - August 1947, 2001 no ISBN
 Volume 5: September–October 1947, 2007
 Jack Kirby's Heroes & Villains, Black Magic Edition, 1994
 Jack Kirby Reader, 2003 (1937–53, 55, 60 work from Prize, Harvey, Charlton) 
 Jack Kirby Reader v2, 2004 (1940, 47–49, 52, 56–57) 
 Joe Kubert Reader, 2011 
 Miss Fury, 2008
 Parade of Pleasure, 2010 
 Thrill Book, 2004 (50s horror & SF comics) 
 Torchy
 Torchy, v2, 2009 
 Alex Toth in Hollywood
 Alex Toth in Hollywood, v2, 2010 
 Alex Toth Reader, 2005
 Alex Toth Reader v2, 2005
 Alex Toth: Edge of Genius v1 2007 (1947–52, Famous Funnies, Standard Comics) 
 Alex Toth: Edge of Genius v2, 2008
 Al Williamson Reader
 Al Williamson: Forbidden Worlds, 2009 
 Basil Wolverton Reader, 2003  (Powerhouse Pepper stories)
 Basil Wolverton Reader v2, 2004 (work from 1942 to 1954)  
 Basil Wolverton: Agony and Ecstasy, 2007 (reprints from "The Bible Story" v1-6) 
 Wallace Wood Reader, 2004 (1951, 56, 64, including Captain Science) 
 Wallace Wood's Wayout, 2005 (wash illos for Galaxy, 58–60, 65 and if 60, 68) 
 Wild Wood, 2010
 Wallace Wood: Edge of Genius, 2009

External links
 

Comic book publishing companies of the United States
American companies established in 1975
1975 establishments in New York City
Publishing companies established in 1975
Publishing companies based in New York City